Lykes Palmdale Airport  is a small, private airport located in Palmdale, Glades County, Florida, United States, near Lake Okeechobee.

Facilities 
Lykes Palmdale Airport has one runway:
 Runway 9/27: , Surface: Turf

References

External links 
Airport Location

Airports in Florida
Transportation buildings and structures in Glades County, Florida